Francis Newbery (6 July 1743 – 17 July 1818) was an English publisher and businessman.

Life
Born on 6 July 1743, he was son of John Newbery the publisher, of St. Paul's Churchyard; alone of his brothers he survived his father. After schooling at Ramsgate and Hoddesdon, Hertfordshire, he entered Merchant Taylors' School in 1758, and matriculated at Trinity College, Oxford, on 1 April 1762. Four years afterwards he migrated to Sidney Sussex College, Cambridge, but he took no degree in either university.

On the death of his father, in 1767, Newbery abandoned plans of a professional career, on the advice of his father's friends Samuel Johnson and Robert James. He went into the business his father had created, both publishing and selling patent medicines. In 1779 he transferred the patent-medicine part of the business to the northeast corner of St. Paul's Churchyard, leaving the book publishing at the old spot. The firm was subsequently known as Newbery & Harris, for the partner John Harris (1756–1846); in 1865 it became Messrs. Griffiths & Farran.

Newbery in 1791 purchased Heathfield Park, the estate of Lord Heathfield in Sussex. He died on 17 July 1818, aged 75.

Works
Oliver Goldsmith died after overdosing on "James's fever powder", the patent of which belonged to Newbery. He published a statement on the case, to defend the reputation of his medicine.

Newbery made translations from classical authors, particularly Horace. They are in the work Donum Amicis: Verses on various occasions by F. N., printed by Thomas Davidson, Whitefriars, 1815.

Verse written by Newbery was set to music, by William Crotch and others. John Wall Callcott, a good friend, set as a glee Hail all the dear delights of home, a poem by Newbery.

Family
Newbery married Mary, daughter of Robert Raikes.

Cousin of the same name
Newbery must be distinguished from his first cousin, also Francis Newbery, of Paternoster Row, bookseller and publisher, and who was in business with John Newbery. This Francis Newbery was the original publisher of The Vicar of Wakefield. He also published the Gentleman's Magazine from 1767 till his death on 8 June 1780.

Notes

Attribution

1743 births
1818 deaths
Publishers (people) from London
Patent medicine businesspeople
People educated at Merchant Taylors' School, Northwood